Third World is a Jamaican reggae fusion band formed in 1973. Their sound is influenced by soul, funk and disco. Although it has undergone several line-up changes, Stephen "Cat" Coore and Richard Daley have been constant members.

History
Third World started when keyboard player Michael "Ibo" Cooper and guitarist (and cellist) Stephen "Cat" Coore (son of former Deputy Prime Minister David Coore), who had originally played in The Alley Cats and then Inner Circle, subsequently left to form their own band along with Inner Circle singer Milton "Prilly" Hamilton. They recruited bassist Richard Daley, formerly of Ken Boothe's band and Tomorrow's Children, and added drummer Carl Barovier and former Inner Circle percussionist Irvin "Carrot" Jarrett before making their live debut in early 1974.

After recording some tracks with Geoffrey Chung which were not released, the band's first single was the self-produced "Railroad Track" (1974). In their early days they played primarily in Kingston's hotels and nightclubs and (along with The Wailers) supported The Jackson Five when they played at the Jamaican National Stadium.

They were soon signed by Island Records and toured Europe with The Wailers. The band's self-titled debut album was released in 1976. The album included a cover of "Satta Massagana", originally performed by The Abyssinians, which became a local hit. Hamilton and Cornell Marshall (who had replaced Barovier earlier) were replaced by two more former Inner Circle members, singer William "Bunny Rugs" Clarke and drummer Willie Stewart, before the recording of their second album, 96° in the Shade (1977), which included several local hits. Notable among its eight tracks were "1865 (96° in the Shade)", a reference to the 1865 Morant Bay rebellion, "Rhythm of Life" and the album's only cover, "Dreamland", written by Bunny Wailer. They played in front of 80,000 people at the Smile Jamaica festival in 1976.

In 1977 the band collaborated with psychiatrist Frederick Hickling on the Explanitations show that was performed at Kingston's Little Theatre early the following year.

Third World's greatest success came in the late 1970s and early 1980s, peaking with their cover version of The O'Jays' "Now That We Found Love" from their third album Journey to Addis. After its initial recording, the single was remixed at the behest of Island Records Special Projects division head, Alex Masucci, with new vocals and an uptempo beat. "Now That We Found Love" became a hit single on both sides of the Atlantic in 1978, reaching the top 10 in the UK. Journey to Addis became a top thirty hit album in the UK. They had first met Stevie Wonder in Jamaica in 1976, and the single prompted him to perform with them at the Reggae Sunsplash festival in 1981 in the wake of Bob Marley's death, playing his tribute to Marley, "Master Blaster". Third World went on to perform several times at the festival, and they also took part in the "Reggae Sunsplash USA" tour in 1985. Wonder also wrote, along with Melody A McCully, their 1982 hit "Try Jah Love", which brought them further exposure in North America. They were also guests during the third season of SCTV.

Amid claims of artistic differences "Carrot" split from the band in the mid-1980s. The resulting five-piece band then went on to record more commercial tunes such as "Sense of Purpose", "Reggae Ambassador", "Forbidden Love" and "Committed".

Their version of "Now That We've Found Love" was used as the basis of Heavy D's 1991 hit rap version. In 1992 they returned to work with Stephen Stewart and Geoffrey Chung on the album Committed.

In 1983, Third World had cross-over success on the UK jazz-funk scene with their reggae single "Lagos Jump" largely thanks to Robbie Vincent and Jeff Young who played the 12-inch version on their Radio London shows. The track also became popular on the London club scene and in particular at Flicks in Dartford.

Telstar Records released a double-album compilation in 1983 which collected up all the mainstream club extended versions and remixes by artists and groups that had enjoyed relatively good UK chart success between 1981 and 1983. Entitled In the Groove, the compilation's lead track on Part Two was Third World's extended version of "Dancing on the Floor (Hooked on Love)". The track had originally been released in 1981 in 7-inch edited and 12-inch extended versions, and included on Third World's Rock the World album. With the release of the Telstar compilation, this brought about an upsurge of interest in Third World's dancefloor output and certainly paved the way for the next two years recordings with Columbia Records (CBS).

In 1985, the group's focus steered by a shifting music scene, brought about a stylistic change in musical direction with the release of "Sense of Purpose". The single was released as a 7-inch edit and 12-inch extended version and later was reissued as a Shep Pettibone club remix. Whilst the single was popular, it only made the lower ends of the UK charts. The 12-inch extended version was released with an instrumental plus the full length version of their 1983 cross-over hit "Lagos Jump" which almost certainly boosted the sales of "Sense of Purpose".

Also in 1985, "Now That We've Found Love" was back in the UK charts again as Paul Hardcastle decided to release a club remix but as with the case of his D-Train remix putting the Hardcastle signature sound of electronic keyboards on the track and reverbing the opening vocal. Whilst the remix was a UK hit, the remix had seemingly lost its reggae roots and the Hardcastle remix has since largely been forgotten in the decades that have followed. The result being that most DJs and radio stations have returned to the original reggae version.

Despite several more line-up changes, including the departures of Cooper and Stewart, and a decline in mainstream success, the band is still recording and performing up to the present day, including in front of a television audience at the Cricket World Cup 2007 Opening Ceremony in Trelawny.

In 2008 the band received a lifetime achievement award from Charles Drew University.

In January 2013, the group was awarded a Lifetime Achievement Award at the Jamaica Jazz and Blues Festival in Montego Bay as they celebrated their 40th year in music.

In 2013 the group completed a 40th anniversary world tour; Illness forced Clarke to miss the European shows, with AJ Brown standing in as lead vocalist.

William "Bunny Rugs" Clarke died on 2 February 2014 in hospital in Orlando, Florida, while battling cancer. Brown was announced as Bunny Rugs' replacement.

The album Under the Magic Sun is due to be released in June 2014 on Cleopatra Records, featuring vocals from Bunny Rugs, Brown, Coore, and Maurice Gregory.

Irvin "Carrot" Jarrett died on 31 July 2018, aged 69.

The group's 2019 album More Work to be Done received a nomination for a Grammy Award in the Best Reggae Album category, the seventh time they have been nominated.

Musical style

While the band played roots reggae, they have also incorporated other styles into their music, and it was the initial influence of The Wailers that prompted the formation of the band to take on a new direction that combined reggae with other genres. The pop-oriented sound has given rise to criticism of the band over the years, with reggae purists uncomfortable with their incorporation of American soul and R&B into their sound. The band have played also folk-pop, hard rock, bossa nova, rap, light pop-jazz, doo-wop and calypso. Their style has been described as reggae fusion. Singer Bunny Rugs described the band's sound: "Strictly a reggae band, no. Definitely a reggae band, yes." Guitarist Cat Coore said of their music: "The hybrid of various types of music is a natural thing because, by growing up in Jamaica, we know the direct roots of reggae and ska. At the same time we live in a country where you get to hear Chuck Berry, Fats Domino and all the R&B artists." Bassist Richard Daley said "we took roots reggae music and put branches on top of it".

Members

Current members
Stephen "Cat" Coore – guitars, cello (1973–present)
Richard Daley – bass (1973–present)
Tony "Ruption" Williams – drums (1997–present)
Norris "Noriega" Webb – keyboards (2007–present)
AJ Brown – vocals (2014–present)

Former members
William "Bunny Rugs" Clarke – vocals (1976–2014; his death)
Michael "Ibo" Cooper – keyboards (1973–1997)
Irvin "Carrot" Jarrett – percussion (1973–1983)
Carl Barovier – drums (1973–1976)
Milton "Prilly" Hamilton – vocals (1973–1976)
Willie Stewart – drums (1976–1997)
Rupert "Gypsy" Bent III – guitars, keyboards, percussion, vocals (1989, 1994)
Leroy "Baarbe" Romans – keyboards (1997–1999)
Mikel Wallace – keyboards (1999)
Herbie Harris – keyboards (2002–2010)
Maurice Gregory - keyboards  (2010-2020)

Discography

Albums
Studio albums

Live albums

Compilations

Singles

References

External links
 Third World official website

Jamaican reggae musical groups
Reggae fusion groups
Island Records artists
Musical groups established in 1973
1973 establishments in Jamaica